Bornova is a station on the currently operating line of the İzmir Metro. It is located near the former Bornova railway station between Ankara and University Avenues. Transfer to city buses are available at an ESHOT bus hub located right next to the station. Plans to extend the line from Evka 3 to Bornova Center have been made but is unclear when construction will start.

Bornova opened on 22 May 2000, four years after the closure of TCDD's Bornova Branch. Between 2000 and 2012, Bornova was the eastern terminus of the line until it was extended two stations further east to Evka 3.

References

İzmir Metro
Railway stations opened in 2000
2000 establishments in Turkey
Railway stations in İzmir Province